Zhao Hongyin (899-956) was a military general in Imperial China's Five Dynasties and Ten Kingdoms period.

After his death, his son Zhao Kuangyin founded the Song dynasty in 960. His other son Zhao Kuangyi would also become a Song emperor. For this reason, Zhao Hongyin is posthumously honored as "Emperor Xuanzu (宣祖) of Song". All emperors of the Song dynasty were his descendants via either Emperor Taizu (most emperors of the Southern Song) or Emperor Taizong (most emperors of the Northern Song).

Early life
Zhao Hongyin decided against a civil career and became a military officer instead under Zhuangzong of Later Tang: he knew that in times of disunity it would be a military career that would lead to success.

The young Zhao Hongyin was a skilled horse archer. He originally served the warlord Wang Rong for the de facto independent Zhao State, and was once ordered by Wang to lead 500 cavalries to assist their ally Li Cunxu in battles, presumably against the Later Liang. Impressed by his bravery, Li kept Zhao as part of his imperial army after the fall of Zhao in 921.

It was also around this period that he married Lady Du who was 3 years his junior. According to popular rumour a few decades after his death, when Zhao Hongyin first came to the area by himself, he encountered a snowstorm and had to beg for food from servants in official Du Shuang's (杜爽) house. After a few days, the servants noticed that he was hardworking and persuaded Du to keep him in the house. A few months later, the family arranged for him to marry their eldest daughter.

Family
Parents:
Father: Zhao Jing (宋翼祖趙敬), honoured as Emperot Yizu
Mother: Lady Liu (簡穆皇后劉氏), honoured as Empress Jianmu

Consorts and Issue:
 Empress Dowager Zhaoxian, of the Du clan (902–961)
 Zhao Guangji, Prince Yong, first son
 Princess Gongxian, first daughter
 Zhao Kuangyin, Taizu (927–976), second son
 Princess Gongyi (d. 973), second daughter
 Married Gao Huaide (926–982) in 960, and had issue (one daughter)
 Zhao Jiong, Taizong (939–997), third son
 Zhao Guangzan, Prince Qi, fifth son
 Lady, of the Geng clan
 Zhao Tingmei, Prince Fudao (947–984), fourth son

Ancestry

References

  
  

Later Zhou people
Later Han (Five Dynasties) people
899 births
956 deaths
Year of birth unknown